Kallithea is a suburb and a former municipality in the Thessaloniki regional unit, Greece. Since the 2011 local government reform it is part of the municipality Oraiokastro, of which it is a municipal unit. Population 6,110 (2011). The municipal unit has an area of 97.494 km2.

References

Populated places in Thessaloniki (regional unit)